The Harras of Dhamar is a volcanic field in Yemen.


Morphology and eruption
The volcanic field extends  to the east of Dhamar town. The field contains many stratovolcanoes, lava flows, and youthful cones. Basaltic lava flows overlie older Rhyolitic flows. The volcano is responsible for the only 20th-century eruption on the Arabian peninsula, apparently in 1937.

See also
 Global Volcanism Program
 List of volcanoes in Yemen
 Sarat Mountains

References

External links
 

Volcanoes of Yemen
Active volcanoes